Francesco Chicchi (born 27 November 1980 in Camaiore) is an Italian retired professional road bicycle racer, who competed as a professional between 2003 and 2016 for the , , ,  and  squads.

Major results

2002
 1st  Road race, UCI Under-23 Road World Championships
 1st Stage 7b Giro Ciclistico d'Italia
2004
 3rd International Grand Prix Doha
 3rd Giro del Piemonte
2005
 1st Stage 1b (TTT) Settimana Internazionale di Coppi e Bartali
 3rd Gran Premio della Costa Etruschi
2006
 1st Stage 1 Four Days of Dunkirk
 1st Stage 5 Tour of Britain
 1st Stage 1 Driedaagse van West-Vlaanderen
 Vuelta a Mallorca
4th Trofeo Cala Millor
8th Trofeo Mallorca
2007
 Danmark Rundt
1st Stages 1 & 4
 1st Stage 4 Brixia Tour
 2nd Paris–Tours
 4th Gran Premio Città di Misano – Adriatico
 8th Gran Premio della Costa Etruschi
2008
 1st Stage 7 Tirreno–Adriatico
 Settimana Internazionale di Coppi e Bartali
1st Stages 1a, 1b (TTT) & 4
 1st Stage 4 Tour of Slovenia
 1st Stage 5 Volta a Catalunya
 1st Stage 7 Tour of Missouri
 2nd Gran Premio della Costa Etruschi
 2nd Giro di Toscana
 5th Gran Premio Città di Misano – Adriatico
2009
 1st Stage 6 Tour Down Under
 1st Stage 6 Tour of Missouri
 9th GP Kranj
2010
 1st Gran Premio Città di Misano – Adriatico
 1st Stage 1 Tour de San Luis
 Settimana Internazionale di Coppi e Bartali
1st Stages 1a & 1b (TTT)
 1st Stage 4 Tour of California
 1st Stage 4 Tour of Slovenia
 8th Overall Tour of Qatar
1st Stages 4 & 6
2011
 6th Scheldeprijs
 9th Tour de Rijke
2012
 1st Nokere Koerse
 1st Handzame Classic
 Tour de San Luis
1st Stages 1 & 2
 1st Stage 1 Driedaagse van West-Vlaanderen
2013
 1st Riga–Jūrmala GP
 1st Jūrmala GP
 Tour de Langkawi
1st  Points classification
1st Stages 4 & 10
 3rd Châteauroux Classic
2014
 Vuelta a Venezuela
1st Stages 1, 7 & 9
 3rd Grand Prix de Denain
 8th Châteauroux Classic
2015
 1st Stage 3 Settimana Internazionale di Coppi e Bartali
 1st Stage 6 Vuelta a Venezuela
2016
 1st Stage 1 Boucles de la Mayenne

Grand Tour general classification results timeline

References

External links
 
Profile at Liquigas official website

Italian male cyclists
1980 births
Living people
Sportspeople from the Province of Lucca
Cyclists from Tuscany